Oscar Ravina (April 27, 1930 – February 25, 2010), born in Warsaw, Poland, was a violinist, violin teacher and concertmaster based in New York, who has had a prolific career as a performer as well as being a current professor emeritus at Montclair State University, where a talent grant in his name is regularly given to outstanding full-time freshmen studying string instruments.

Early career
Mr. Ravina began his musical career in Poland, and continued his studies at the Saint Petersburg Conservatory in Leningrad; the Anton Bruckner Private University for Music, Drama, and Dance in Linz, Austria; the Mozarteum in Salzburg; and the Vienna State Academy in Vienna. It was Isaac Stern who urged him to move to the United States, where he continued his studies with Nicoline Zedeler Mix, Professor L. Persinger, and at the Manhattan School of Music.

Career
A former concertmaster of the Philharmonia Virtuosi of New York, a chamber orchestra consisting of leading New York Philharmonic musicians, which he helped to organize, Mr. Ravina was a long time a member of the New York Philharmonic and an active member of the New York Philharmonic Ensembles.
As founder of the Ravina String Quartet, he concertized and recorded in both the United States and Canada and developed special programs for young audiences. Since 1976, he was concertmaster of the Masterwork Orchestra, Masterwork Chamber Orchestra, and St. Cecilia Orchestra.
He also taught chamber music at Dartmouth College and the Waterloo Music Festival, and has performed under almost every major conductor of the last three decades. His solo performances include concerts with the National Orchestral Association of New York, Brooklyn Philharmonia, Westchester Philharmonic, Symphony of the Air, New Philharmonia of New York, and Philharmonia Virtuosi.
For more than eleven seasons, Mr. Ravina was music director and conductor of the Montclair Chamber Ensemble.

Recordings
In a career spanning more than four decades, Mr. Ravina recorded solo and chamber music for many record labels, including: Orion, Orion I, RCA Victor, Columbia, Vox, Serenus, Nonesuch, CBS, Spectrum, Crystal Records, New World Records, Sony, and Centaur Records.

Partial discography
Basically Bach: Sony (2004), with: Edward Power Biggs (organ), Glenn Gould (piano), Hilary Hahn (violin), Oscar Ravina (violin), Ronald Roseman (oboe), William Bennett (flute), Yo-Yo Ma (cello)
John Adams: On the Transmigration of Souls (2004)
Goin' for Baroque: Sony (1995) Neil Black (oboe), Oscar Ravina (violin), Philharmonia Virtuosi of New York, William Bennett (flute)
The Baroque Era: The Life, Times & Music Series, 1600–1750 (1992) Musici di San Marco, Neil Black (oboe), Oscar Ravina (violin), Philharmonia Virtuosi of New York, William Bennett (flute)
Mozart: Serenades Nos. 4–7 & 9: Vox Classical (1992) Dieter Vorholz (violin), Gerard Schwarz (posthorn), Oscar Ravina (violin), Philharmonia Virtuosi of New York, Mainz Chamber Orchestra
Ellen Taaffe Zwilich: Symbolon; Concerto Grosso; Double Quartet; Trumpet Concerto – New World Records (1989) Christopher Lamb (percussion), Daniel Reed (violin), Hae-Young Ham (violin), Harriet Wingreen (piano), Judith Nelson (viola), Kerry McDermot (violin), Mindy Kaufman (flute), Mindy Kaufman (piccolo), Nancy Donaruma (cello), Oscar Ravina (violin)
Mozart Serenades. Philharmonia Virtuosi of New York, Richard Kapp, Conductor. Oscar Ravina vioin solo – Vox 3 Lp box, SVBX 5107 (1979)
Greatest Hits Of 1720: CBS (1977) Gerard Schwarz (trumpet), Judith Norell (soprano), Matitahu Braun (violin), Oscar Ravina (violin), Philharmonia Virtuosi of New York, Ronald Roseman (oboe), Richard Kapp (conductor)

Notable performances
Montclair State College Orchestra: Mr. Ravina, conductor; Eric Schaberg, violinist (concerto competition winner). Max Bruch's Violin Concerto in G.
Weill Recital Hall 1997, 1999, 2002

Teaching legacy
Mr. Ravina taught hundreds of students over the last three decades. Some of the groups that they have gone on to play with include:
Montclair Chamber Players, Arkansas Symphony Orchestra, New Sussex Symphony, Grand Rapids Symphony, St. Cecila Chorus and Orchestra, N.J. Pops, Syracuse Symphony Orchestra, Harrisburg Symphony Orchestra, Munich Symphony Orchestra, New Jersey Symphony Orchestra, Montclair Chamber Ensemble, Chelsea Opera, Orchestra-of-the-Bronx, Garden State Philharmonic, Staten Island Symphony, Harlem Festival Orchestra, Roanoke Symphony Orchestra, Greater Newburgh Symphony Orchestra, Key West Symphony and the Hudson Valley Philharmonic., Boston Ballet Orchestra, The Boston Symphony,The Royal Concertgebouw Orchestra

References

Boston Ballet Orchestra, The Boston Symphony,The Royal Concertgebouw Orchestra

External links 
 Montclair State University
 New York Philharmonic
Obituary

1930 births
2010 deaths
American classical violinists
Male classical violinists
American male violinists
Polish classical violinists
Concertmasters
Violin pedagogues
Montclair State University faculty
American people of Polish-Jewish descent
20th-century classical violinists
20th-century American male musicians
20th-century American violinists